Sergey Vladimirovich Perets (28 September 1969 — 16 August 2002) was a Russian police officer who was killed during the Second Chechen War in 2002 and was posthumously awarded the title of Hero of the Russian Federation.

Early life
Perets was born in Kostroma in 1969. In December 1991, Perets joined the Russian Ground Forces, followed by working in the transport arm of the Ministry of Internal Affairs (MVD) before being transferred to Cherepovets.

As a police officer
He was assigned to the militsiya in Cherepovets, the MVD's police arm due to his military experience. He worked as a traffic policeman (the GAI agency) for four years, until 1998 when he was assigned as the commander of a motorised platoon of militia near Vologda.

Chechnya
From 1998 until 2002, he conducted seven tours of duty in Chechnya as a militiaman in the first and second wars there. His final tour of duty commenced on July 25, 2002 in the early stages of the Second Chechen War. He was noted as the most experienced captain in the motorised police units.

Fatal incident
On August 16, 2002, Perets' unit received intelligence that a unit of riot police from Omsk were under attack in the village of Shalazhi. Perets's unit, composing of three armoured personnel carriers headed there, and upon arriving in the village they opened fire upon militants in the village.

However, the degree of returning fire forced the convoy to stop and fight. During the battle, Perets' APC was cut off from the others and he and his men fought for three hours during which Perets received a wound from shrapnel from a hand grenade but carried on regardless. He dragged one of his men who was injured into cover.

Thanks to Perets' command, the rebels failed to inflict serious damage on the convoy. While running from cover to the APC, he was shot in the head by a sniper and killed instantly. Several minutes after Perets' death, the other APCs rejoined them and the militants scattered, with five killed and seven captured. Two MVD troops were injured in the battle, amongst them the soldier whom Perets dragged to safety.

He was buried in Cherepovets.

Awards
 Hero of the Russian Federation (8 November 2003, posthumously) - for "courage and heroism in the line of duty in the North Caucasus region."
 Order of Courage
 Medal of the Order of Merit for the Fatherland, 2nd class with swords
 Medal For Courage
 Medal for Distinguished Service in Defending Public Order
 Medal "For courage in service" (MIA)

References
Heroes of the Russian Federation - Perets, Sergey Vladimirovich

1969 births
2002 deaths
People from Kostroma
Heroes of the Russian Federation
Recipients of the Order of Courage
Recipients of the Medal "For Courage" (Russia)
People of the Chechen wars
Russian police officers
Police officers killed in the line of duty